Henry O'Callaghan Prittie, 4th Baron Dunalley (21 March 1851 – 5 August 1927), was an Anglo-Irish peer.

Dunalley was the son of Henry Prittie, 3rd Baron Dunalley. He was educated at Harrow School and Trinity College, Cambridge. In 1883, Prittie was appointed High Sheriff of Tipperary. He succeeded his father as fourth Baron Dunalley in 1885 but as this was an Irish peerage it did not entitle him to an automatic seat in the House of Lords. However, in 1891 he was elected an Irish Representative Peer, which he remained until his death. Lord Dunalley also served as Lord Lieutenant of County Tipperary from 1905 to 1922. He died in August 1927, aged 76, and was succeeded in the barony by his son Henry.

He was the owner of 'Countess' a 15-ton yacht on Lough Derg from 1893 to 1919.

He was Commodore of the Lough Derg Yacht Club from 1905 until his death in 1927.

He married Mary Frances Farmer (10 August 1857 – 18 May 1929) daughter of Reginald Onslow Farmer (1828–1904) on 22 August 1876 at Hatfield Hertfordshire. They had six children:

 Henry Cornelius O'Callaghan Prittie (19 July 1877 – 3 May 1948) the 5th Baron Dunalley 
 Maura Geraldine Anne Prittie (2 September 1879 – 19 May 1880) 
 Francis Reginald Dennis Prittie (15 October 1880 – 19 December 1914) 
 Kathleen Everilda Prittie (13 April 1882 – 27 April 1910) 
 Mary Prittie (b. 24 January 1885) 
 Irene Rose Prittie (24 April 1887 – 2 November 1887)

Notes

References 
 Kidd, Charles, Williamson, David (editors). Debrett's Peerage and Baronetage (1990 edition). New York: St Martin's Press, 1990,

External links
 

1851 births
1927 deaths
19th-century Anglo-Irish people
20th-century Anglo-Irish people
Barons in the Peerage of Ireland
High Sheriffs of Tipperary
Lord-Lieutenants of Tipperary
People educated at Harrow School
Alumni of Trinity College, Cambridge
Rifle Brigade officers
British military personnel of the Third Anglo-Ashanti War
Irish representative peers